George Ziegenfuss (September 26, 1917 – December 2, 2007) was the head men's basketball coach at San Diego State University from 1948 until 1969.

Playing career
Born in Centerville, Wisconsin, Ziegenfuss was a three-year letterman for the Washington Huskies. He was an All-Pacific Coast Conference player in 1939, when the Huskies finished 20-5 under coach Hec Edmundson.

Coaching career

Ziegenfuss was the winningest and longest-tenured head coach for the San Diego State Aztecs men's basketball team, serving from 1948 until 1969. He compiled 316 wins during his tenure, winning five conference championships. He died on December 2, 2007 in San Diego, California. He was inducted into the Aztecs Hall of Fame in 1994.

References

1917 births
2007 deaths
Basketball coaches from Wisconsin
American men's basketball players
San Diego State Aztecs men's basketball coaches
Washington Huskies men's basketball players